Haemadipsa is a genus of leeches, with members commonly known as jawed land leeches. These annelids are known from subtropical and tropical regions around the Indian and Pacific Ocean. Well-known Haemadipsa are for example the Indian Leech (Haemadipsa sylvestris) and the yamabiru or Japanese Mountain Leech (Haemadipsa zeylanica). Members of the genus feed on blood. They are troublesome to humans and animals especially because their bites result in prolonged bleeding.

Species in the genus Haemadipsa

Haemadipsa cavatuses
Haemadipsa cochiniana
Haemadipsa crenata
Haemadipsa hainana
Haemadipsa interrupta
Haemadipsa japonica
Haemadipsa limuna
Haemadipsa moorei
Haemadipsa montana
Haemadipsa ornata
Haemadipsa picta (Tiger leech)
Haemadipsa rjukjuana
Haemadipsa sumatrana
Haemadipsa sylvestris (Indian leech)
Haemadipsa trimaculosa
Haemadipsa zeylanica (Japanese mountain leech)

References

Leeches
Annelid genera
Parasitic protostomes